Boulet may refer to:

 Boulet (surname)
 Boulet (comics), pseudonym of the French comic book artist Gilles Roussel
 Bouleț, a river in Romania

See also
 Prix Lionel-Boulet, Prix du Québec award for researchers
 Rue des Boulets (Paris Métro), a station of the Paris Metro
 Viyé-l'-Boulet, Walloon name for a village spelt Villers-le-Bouillet in French